Kelvin Glare  (born 6 January 1938 in Hopetoun, Victoria) is a former Australian police officer, who was Chief Commissioner of Victoria Police from 1987 to 1992.

After he retired Glare was employed by Argyle Diamonds to look into the case of stolen pink diamonds. He was unable to retrieve any pink diamonds from Europe but was involved in investigating how Western Australia Police had approached their theft which culminated in a discussion of possible corrupt or criminal conduct by police at the Kennedy Royal Commission.

References

Further reading
 

1938 births
Living people
Australian barristers
Chief Commissioners of Victoria Police
Officers of the Order of Australia
Recipients of the Australian Police Medal
University of Melbourne alumni